Galatina, known before the unification of Italy as San Pietro in Galatina, is a town and comune in the Province of Lecce in Apulia, southern Italy.

Main sights

The late Romanesque church of Santa Caterina d'Alessandria, built in 1390 by Raimondello del Balzo Orsini, count of Soleto, with a fine portal and rose window. The interior contains frescoes by Francesco d'Arezzo (1435). The apse contains the fine mausoleum of the son of the founder, a canopy supported by four columns, with his statue beneath it.
The Baroque church of San Pietro (also known as Mother Church), rebuilt from 1633 on a previous Greek-rite edifice.
The Pupa, a fountain in local limestone

In the neighbourhood is the small church of San Paolo. It houses a well which, according to tradition, was able to heal people bitten by poisonous tarantulas (those bitten are called tarantati or pizzicati in the local dialect).

Transportation
Galatina has a station on the Ferrovie Sud-Est line to Lecce. Road connections include the SS16 Adriatica state highway, the SS101 state road, also to Lecce, and the SS 613 Brindisi-Lecce highway.

Energy
Near Galatina is the static inverter plant of HVDC Italy-Greece.

Twin towns
 Novi Grad, Bosnia-Herzegovina, since 1997
 Sapes, Greece, since 1999

Notes

Cities and towns in Apulia
Localities of Salento